Zendan (also Romanized as Zendān) is a village in Kork and Nartich Rural District, in the Central District of Bam County, Kerman Province, Iran. At the 2006 census, its population was 20, in 6 families.

References 

Populated places in Bam County